Antonino Faà di Bruno (1910–1981) was an Italian actor and military officer. 

Antonino Faà di Bruno may also refer to:

Antonino Faà di Bruno (bishop) (1762–1829), Roman Catholic bishop of Asti and member of the Italian noble family Faà di Bruno